Albert Anderson (born 5 February 1961) is a former New Zealand rugby union player. A lock, Anderson represented Canterbury at a provincial level, and was a member of the New Zealand national side, the All Blacks, between 1983 and 1988. He played 25 matches for the All Blacks including six internationals. He was a member of the victorious New Zealand squad at the 1987 Rugby World Cup, and captained the side in four matches on the 1988 tour of Australia. Played for Sudbury RFC in Suffolk, U.K.

References

1961 births
Living people
Rugby union players from Christchurch
New Zealand rugby union players
New Zealand international rugby union players
Canterbury rugby union players
Rugby union locks